Évariste Lévi-Provençal (4 January 1894 – 27 March 1956) was a French medievalist, orientalist, Arabist, and historian of Islam.

The scholar who would take the name Lévi-Provençal was born 4 January 1894 in Constantine, French Algeria, as Makhlóuf Evariste Levi, his second name revealing that his North-African Jewish family was already somewhat Gallicized. By the age of nineteen when he published his first paper he had rechristened himself Évariste Lévi-Provençal. He studied at the Lycée in Constantine, and served in the French army during World War I, being wounded in the Dardanelles in 1917. He then joined the Institut des Hautes Etudes Marocaines. He held positions at the University of Algiers (1926) and later the Sorbonne (1945).

Lévi-Provençal was the founder of the French study of Islam and the first director of the Institute of Islamic Studies (Institut d'études islamiques) in Algiers. He specialized in the history of al-Andalus and the Muslims of Spain. He worked on editing and translating the Arabic sources for the medieval history of Spain, often with Spanish Arabist Emilio García Gómez.  His writings about Muslims scholarship were both admiring and critical.  He was anticolonial in his leanings, and he tended to ignore or underplay Jewish sources and obfuscate his own Jewish origins to avoid French Antisemitism.

Selected works
 
 Histoire de l'Espagne musulmane, (1944-1953)
 Séville musulmane au début du XIIe siècle
 L'Espagne musulmane au Xe siècle. Institutions et vie sociale (Paris, Maisonneuve & Larose, 1932)

References

Sources
 Park, Thomas Kerlin and Aomar Boum, "Lévi-Provençal, Évariste", Historical dictionary of Morocco, 2016, pp. 309–10.
 Wasserstein, David, "Nota biographica: Makhlouf Levi and Evariste Lévi-Provençal", Al-Qanṭara, 21 (2000): 211–214.

External links

 Évariste Lévi-Provençal at BibilioMonde 
Biography 

1894 births
People from Algiers
1956 deaths
Algerian Jews
Academic staff of the University of Algiers
Academic staff of the University of Paris
Algerian emigrants to France
French Arabists
French Islamic studies scholars
20th-century French historians
Officiers of the Légion d'honneur
Scholars of Al-Andalus history